The Wushan horned toad (Boulenophrys wushanensis) is a species of frog in the family Megophryidae.
It is only known from its type locality in the Wu Mountains of Chongqing Municipality (formerly part of Sichuan province) and is thus endemic to China. 
Its natural habitats are subtropical or tropical moist montane forests and rivers.
It is threatened by habitat loss.

References

Boulenophrys
Amphibians of China
Endemic fauna of China
Taxonomy articles created by Polbot
Amphibians described in 1995